Brigham Young (June 1, 1801 – August 29, 1877) was an American leader in the Latter Day Saint movement and a settler of the Western United States. He was the President of the Church of Jesus Christ of Latter-day Saints (LDS Church) from 1847 until his death in 1877. He founded Salt Lake City and he served as the first governor of the Utah Territory. Young also led the foundings of the precursors to the University of Utah and Brigham Young University.

Young was a polygamist, marrying a total of 55 wives, 54 of them after he converted to Mormonism. The policy was difficult for many in the church. Young stated that upon being taught about plural marriage, "It was the first time in my life that I desired the grave." By the time of his death, Young had 56 children by 16 of his wives; 46 of his children reached adulthood.

In 1902, 25 years after Young's death, The New York Times established that Young's direct descendants numbered more than 1,000.

In 2016 Brigham Young was estimated to have around 30,000 descendants.

Notable descendants
The following are notable descendants of Brigham Young.

See also
 List of Brigham Young's wives

References

External links
 Young Family Genealogy. MSS SC 981; Young Family genealogy; 20th Century Western and Mormon Manuscripts; L. Tom Perry Special Collections, Harold B. Lee Library, Brigham Young University.
Brigham Young's Wives, Children, and Grandchildren. MSS SC 1995; 20th Century Western and Mormon Manuscripts; L. Tom Perry Special Collections, Harold B. Lee Library, Brigham Young University.

Brigham Young
Young, Descendants
Mormonism and polygamy
Young Descendants
 
Young, Brigham